The Ven Folliott George Sandford (26 April 1861 in Sheffield – 14 July 1945 in Tickhill) was the inaugural Archdeacon of Doncaster.

He was born into an ecclesiastical family  and educated at  Sheffield Collegiate School and Corpus Christi College, Cambridge. He was ordained  in 1884 and his first post was as a Curate at Sheffield Parish Church. In 1888 he married Rosamond Mary Blakelock and also became Rector of  Holy Trinity Church, Goodramgate, York. He became Vicar of St Andrew's Sharrow in 1893; and Vicar and Rural Dean of Huddersfield in 1903. He was Chaplain to the 2nd Duke of Wellington's West Riding Regiment; from 1903 to 1905; Chaplain to the Queen's Own Yorkshire Dragoons from 1905 onwards He was Vicar of Doncaster from  1905 to 1928; Rural Dean of Doncaster from 1910 to 1919; Prebendary of Dunnington in York Minster from 1909 to 1914; Archdeacon of Doncaster from 1913 to 1941 and Chaplain to the Corporation of Doncaster during the same period; and an Honorary Canon of Sheffield Cathedral from 1914.

References

1861 births
Clergy from Sheffield
People educated at Sheffield Collegiate School
Alumni of Corpus Christi College, Cambridge
Archdeacons of Doncaster
1945 deaths